Dawson Duel is a racing alpine coaster at Bellewaerde near Ypres, Belgium. The attraction became the first in Europe to race two alpine coaster tracks against one another, and the first to also be built on an artificial, man-made slope instead of natural terrain. Dawson Duel's name and theme pays homage to the town of Dawson City in the Yukon Territory, and the Yukon Quest Sled dog racing event. The ride was constructed at a cost of €4,000,000 and is one of the most popular attractions in the park.

History
On 13 September 2016 Bellewaerde officials announced the construction of a European first; a dueling alpine coaster built on an elevated manmade slope. Construction began soon after, and continued throughout the winter, with track first being installed on the support structure in January.

On 27 January 2017, during a press conference at the attraction's construction site, park officials unveiled the name of the ride to be Dawson Duel, after the Canadian town, Dawson City, Yukon. An animated 3D simulation of the ride structure and experience was subsequently released on YouTube. Following the ride's completion and weeks of test runs, Dawson Duel opened to the public on 5 May 2017. The ride quickly became one of the park's most popular attractions, and throughout the 2017 season wait times would fluctuate between an average 40-70 minutes.

For the 2018 season, following excessive wait times caused by the low capacity, Bellewaerde and Wiegand made several modifications to the ride system that would raise its capacity by an estimated 50%. The loading procedure and brake test system was optimized, and six new cars were purchased, thus enabling the ride to run more carts on the track. The modifications were inspected and approved by the third-party T.U.V. service company. In 2019, two years after the coaster opened, Bellewaerde would continue to combat long wait times and begin testing a virtual queue system using the smartphone app Lineberty.

Characteristics

Ride experience
Upon reaching the boarding platform, riders are divided between either of the two tracks; green or blue. Riders will board the tracks and race each another down to the ground through a consistent descent, which includes a pair of helixes along the way. At the bottom of the ride, the cars enter the brake run, and riders onboard at the unload platform and the cars are hoisted back up to the load platform by a winding cable lift hill.

Statistics
Dawson Duel has a pair of parallel tracks, known informally as Blue and Green, each of which are identical. However, out of the entire circuit, only  of track is traversed with riders on board, as the cars are pulled to the boarding platform from the unload station without riders. Between both tracks, Dawson Duel first operated with 40 cars, although an extra half-dozen were purchased for the 2018 season, and following modifications the attraction can now run 46. Each of these cars can sit 1-2 riders inline, and unlike most other alpine coasters, riders do not have access to manual braking throughout the ride.

Dawson Duel is manufactured by Wiegand, a German firm that specializes in alpine coasters and waterslides, some of which would be provided for the Bellewaerde Aquapark in 2019. The attraction is the first of Wiegand's Sport Coaster model line, whose sole difference from the average alpine coaster is the lack of rider-controlled brakes, which was removed in favor of automatic braking. To substitute for the risk of riders going over speed or getting too close to another car ahead, each car has sensors that will keep the speed below or at  if that is the case, or a compulsory stop at the bottom, thus ensuring that there is no risk of collision.

Ride structure
Dawson Duel is built on a network of steel and wooden supports to make up for the lack of natural terrain that alpine coasters are built around. All parts of the ride except for the coaster's track, trains, and immediate hardware were developed and manufactured locally; the track pieces were manufactured at Wiegand's plant in Germany, and installed on top of these supports. The layout of the ride itself was designed in a close collaboration between Bellewaerde and Wiegand.

Theme
Dawson Duel is themed around the annual 1,000-mile Yukon Quest Sled dog racing event, which typically starts in Fairbanks, Alaska, and ends in Whitehorse, Yukon. The Canadian town of Dawson City serves as the half-way point and enforces a mandatory resting period of 36 hours for all participants. It is this factor that the ride's name is derived from, and the park considers the climb up to the top to be the "first half" of the race, and the ride back down as the second.

Photo Gallery

References

Roller coasters in Belgium